WCOA (1370 kHz) is a commercial AM radio station in Pensacola, Florida, serving the Emerald Coast.  It is owned by Cumulus Media and broadcasts a talk radio format. The radio studios and offices are on North W Street off Pensacola Boulevard (U.S. Route 29).

By day, WCOA is powered at 5,000 watts non-directional.  At night, to protect other stations on 1370 AM, it reduces power to 4,400 watts and uses a directional antenna with a three-tower array  The transmitter is on Hollywood Avenue near Massachusetts Avenue in Brent, Florida.

Programming
Weekdays begin on WCOA with "Good Morning Pensacola," a local news and information program.  The rest of the weekday schedule is made up of nationally syndicated conservative talk shows, mostly from the co-owned Westwood One Network.  They include Chris Plante, Dan Bongino, Ben Shapiro, Mark Levin, Jim Bohannon, "Red Eye Radio" and "America in the Morning."  Also heard from Premiere Networks is Sean Hannity.

Weekends feature shows on money, health, real estate and technology.  Weekend programs include Kim Komando, "Meet The Press" and repeats of weekday shows.  Most hours begin with world and national news from ABC News Radio.

History
On February 3, 1926, hundreds of people gathered in Plaza Ferdinand in downtown Pensacola to hear the first sounds of radio in Northwest Florida. At precisely 8:30 p.m. WCOA went on the air, and the broadcast was piped over a large horn on top of City Hall. Locals who owned receivers could tune into the 250-watt signal that was broadcast from two 100-foot towers located behind City Hall.

City Clerk John E. Frenkel Sr., who used the moniker Breezy Boy from the Gulf, hosted the first program. It featured local talent, city officials and representatives of area military bases. The grand finale was a rendition of a song called "Down Pensacola Way" that was composed especially for the big unveiling. According to letters and calls, over 700 people listened to the first broadcast.

When the city government changed form in 1931, WCOA was purchased by John C. Pace for $6,500. When he purchased the station on December 1, 1931, he indicated he would spend $20,000 in modernizing the station. The studios were moved to the San Carlos Hotel where they remained until 1949. Pace eventually sold the station to the company that owned the Pensacola News Journal newspaper, which sold it in 1957.

The station increased its power to 5,000 watts September 8, 1947.

WCOA operated for many years as an affiliate of NBC. The programming featured middle of the road music, news and sports. The station's popularity grew. In 1956 when WCOA celebrated 30 years on the air, congratulatory telegrams were received from musicians such as Nat King Cole and Frank Sinatra.

The station changed ownership, location and network affiliation several more times over the years. In 1991, the programming switched to a news-talk format.

WCOA also has a place in the Congressional Record, recognizing the 80th anniversary of WCOA.

References

External links
WCOA News/Talk 1370 - Official Site

FCC History Cards for WCOA
''Radio Service Bulletin, November 30, 1929, U.S. Department of Commerce
Broadcasting Year Book 1940 by Broadcasting Publications, Inc.
Colee, Donn R., Jr. Towers in the Sand:  The History of Florida Broadcasting, 2016

News and talk radio stations in the United States
COA
Cumulus Media radio stations
1926 establishments in Florida
Radio stations established in 1926